is a Japanese actor and singer. He is best known for his role as Gakuto Mukahi in The Prince of Tennis musicals. He is managed by Amuse, Inc.

Appearances

Musicals
Musical Kuroshitsuji: That Butler, friendship (May 28, 2009 and June 7, 2009) Yuki, Japanese visitor

Stage Productions 
Musical Tennis no Ohjisama The Imperial Match Hyotei Gakuen (2005) as Gakuto Mukahi
Musical Tennis no Ohjisama The Imperial Match Hyotei Gakuen in winter (2005–2006) as Gakuto Mukahi
Musical Tennis no Ohjisama Dream Live 3rd (2006) as Gakuto Mukahi
On Line (2006) as Machi
Musical Tennis no Ohjisama Advancement Match Rokkaku feat. Hyotei Gakuen (2006) as Gakuto Mukahi
Frogs (2007) as Amane
On line Volume 2: Roomshare (2007) as Kuruma Kenya
Musical Tennis no Ohjisama Dream Live 4th (2007) as Gakuto Mukahi
 Sukedachi (2007)
 Blue Sheets (2008) as Kohei
Musical Tennis no Ohjisama The Imperial Presence Hyotei Gakuen feat. Higa Chuu (2008) as Gakuto Mukahi
Musical Tennis no Ohjisama The Treasure Match Shitenhouji feat. Hyoutei Gakuen  (2008–2009) as Gakuto Mukahi

TV Shows 

24 no Hitomi
Gokusen 3
Sunadokei as Tsukishima Fuji

Movies 
Shinrei Shashin Jusatsu (2006) as Kazuyoshi
Gothic & Lolita Psycho (2010) as Masato

Discography 

(2006.7.26) Musical Tennis no Ohjisama Best Actor's Series 004 Takumi Saitoh as Yushi Oshitari & Ruito Aoyagi as Gakuto Mukahi

External links 
Official website
Official Blog

Japanese male stage actors
1990 births
Living people
Actors from Hokkaido
Amuse Inc. talents
21st-century Japanese singers
21st-century Japanese male singers